In Greek mythology, Bremon (Ancient Greek: Βρέμοντα means "roar") was a Greek warrior who was killed in the Trojan War by the hero Aeneas, son of the goddess Aphrodite and Anchises of Dardanus.

See also 

 List of Trojan War characters

Note

References 

 Quintus Smyrnaeus, The Fall of Troy translated by Way. A. S. Loeb Classical Library Volume 19. London: William Heinemann, 1913. Online version at theio.com
Quintus Smyrnaeus, The Fall of Troy. Arthur S. Way. London: William Heinemann; New York: G.P. Putnam's Sons. 1913. Greek text available at the Perseus Digital Library.

Characters in Greek mythology